The Shepparton Fruit Loop Ride is non-competitive charitable cycle ride held in the area around Shepparton, Victoria, Australia. Money raised helps finance the efforts of the Goulburn Valley Hospice. The ride is so named due to the large amount of stone fruit grown in the Goulburn Valley and Shepparton region.

The 2006 event consisted of three options and raised $42,000 for the hospice:
  route with hills
  route
  route

See also

Cycling in Victoria

References

External links

Cycling in Victoria (Australia)
Cycling events in Victoria
Shepparton